This is a list of notable awards won by Degrassi, a Canadian teen drama entertainment series and media franchise that depicts a group of students facing the typical issues and challenges of teen life. The Degrassi fictional universe, created by Linda Schuyler and Kit Hood under their production company Playing With Time, is the setting of five television series that began with The Kids of Degrassi Street in 1979 and ended with Degrassi: Next Class in 2017. In addition, television movies (School's Out, Degrassi Takes Manhattan), documentary mini-series (Degrassi Talks), as well as books (Degrassi Junior High and High novels, Degrassi: Extra Credit) and other multimedia complement the franchise. 
 
Spanning four decades, Degrassi has won many different awards, including twenty-eight Gemini Awards, six Directors Guild of Canada Awards, and a Peabody Award. In 2005, Degrassi was the subject of a CBC Television Gemini Special as the "Top Canadian Show of the Last 20 Years", while Degrassi: The Next Generation was the first Canadian series to be awarded the Choice Summer Series at the Teen Choice Awards. Each incarnation in the Degrassi franchise has received recognition: The Kids of Degrassi Street received eight awards and one nominations; Degrassi Junior High received twenty awards and six nominations; Degrassi High received seven awards and six nominations; School's Out won one award and one other nomination; Degrassi Talks garnered one nomination; Degrassi: The Next Generation earned itself fifty-seven awards and another seventy-five nominations; and  Degrassi: Next Class garnered four wins with another twenty-three nominations to date.

ACTRA Award
The ACTRA Awards celebrate excellence in television and radio industries.  They were first presented in 1972 then revived in 2003 with regional branches presenting their own awards.

American Children's Television Festival

Awards of Excellence Gala
The Awards of Excellence Gala is hosted annually by the Alliance for Children and Television, formerly known as the Children's Broadcast Institute. Professionals involved in children's television productions award children's programs made in Canada that stand out for their excellence. The ACT has honoured Degrassi with seven awards and one nomination. Linda Schuyler and Kit Hood also won an award for "Best Independent Producer" in 1983.

Banff Television Festival

Canadian Film & Television Awards

Canadian Screen Awards
The Canadian Screen Awards are an annual Canadian television industry awards ceremony given out by the Academy of Canadian Cinema & Television to Canadian television shows, films, and digital media. It replaced the Gemini Awards in 2012.

Canadian Screenwriting Awards
First awarded in 1997, the Canadian Screenwriting Awards are given out annually by the Writers Guild of Canada. Through Degrassi: The Next Generation, Degrassi has received nominations for three Best Youth Script Awards, and won two of them. 2005 saw two D:TNG episodes pitted against each other.

The Chris Awards
The Chris Awards are hosted by the Columbus International Film and Video Festival, an annual film festival held in Columbus, OH to encourage and promote the use of film and video in all forms of education and communication. Degrassi has seven Chris Statuettes, the highest award given to film or video productions. Entries are judged on a seven-point rating system. A superior rating of seven is required for winning the Chris.

Creative Arts Emmy Awards
The Creative Arts Emmy Award is a class of Emmy Awards presented in recognition of technical and other similar achievements in American television programming. The Creative Arts Emmys also include such categories as outstanding animated programs and guest acting.

DGC Awards
The Directors Guild of Canada's first award ceremony was held on October 5, 2002. As such, only Degrassi: The Next Generation has been able to garner recognition for Degrassi. Degrassi has won six awards, taking home three of those in 2003, more than any other television production.

The EDGE Awards
The EDGE (Entertainment Depiction of Gun Education) Awards recognize feature films, TV movies, reality programs and episodes of scripted television series that effectively promote firearm safety and discourage gun violence. They are awarded annually by The Entertainment Industries Council.

Gemini Awards
The Gemini Awards were an annual Canadian television industry awards ceremony given out by the Academy of Canadian Cinema and Television to English language television shows. Awarded from 1986 to 2011, every incarnation of Degrassi was nominated for at least one award each year they have been on air, except 1991. Together, they have won twenty-four awards and thirty-five more nominations.

GLAAD Media Awards
The GLAAD Media Awards were created in 1990 by the Gay & Lesbian Alliance Against Defamation to recognize and honor the mainstream media for their fair, accurate and inclusive representations of the LGBT community and the issues that affect their lives.

The Hugo Awards
The Chicago International Film Festival awarded Degrassi: The Next Generation a Silver Plaque at the Hugo Awards (not to be confused with the Hugo Awards for the best science fiction or fantasy works from the World Science Fiction Society) for Best Children's Program in 2003.

Humanitas Prize
The Humanitas Prize is an award for film and television writing intended to promote human dignity, meaning, and freedom.  It was first award in 1975 for television writers only.  Nineteen years later, it was expanded to include films.  Degrassi: Next Class is the only series in the franchise to be a finalist and win.

Ingenuity Award
The Ingenuity Award recognizes individuals for their accomplishments in promoting new and better ways of doing things for Canada. 2004 saw Degrassi creator and Epitome Pictures president Linda Schuyler win an Ingenuity award for her work in Canadian television.

International Emmy Awards
The International Emmy Awards are presented to the best television programs produced throughout the world. Degrassi has won two International Emmy in the "Children & Young People" category through The Kids of Degrassi Street and Degrassi Junior High. When executive producer Kit Hood accepted the award for DJH, he announced that if Spike's baby were a boy, it would be named Ralph, after the president of the ATAS, and if it was a girl, it would be called Emma, after the Emmy.

International New Media Awards
The International New Media Awards are judged by new media professionals and presented at the annual International New Media Festival. Degrassi won two awards in 2002 for its official website.

The Joey Awards, Vancouver
The Joey Awards are presented to honour and recognize young performers in Canada through awards and educating parents on keeping them safe in show business.

NAACP Image Awards
The NAACP Image Awards are presented by the National Association for the Advancement of Colored People to honour outstanding people of color in film, television, music, and literature.

The NCFR Media Awards
The National Council on Family Relations recognised Degrassi: The Next Generation for its quality family programming at its 34th Annual Awards in 2001,  and 36th in 2003. The awards recognize excellence in commercial and educational television that address social issues. Degrassi has received seven first place awards for six episodes, two second place award for two more episodes, and an honorable mention for another.

Parent's Choice Award
The  Parents' Choice Awards have been awarded to the best children's media since 1978. The judging panel is made up of educators, scientists, performing artists, librarians, parents and kids to help parents make informed decisions about which new products are right for their children.

Peabody Award
First awarded in 1941, the George Foster Peabody Award awards excellence in radio and television broadcasting.

PRISM Awards
The PRISM Awards are awarded by the Entertainment Industries Council for entertainment for accurate portrayals of substance abuse, addiction and mental health.

Prix Jeunesse
Degrassi has won two Prix Jeunesse awards, and has been nominated for another two. The awards are held bi-annually in Munich, Germany, and aim to improve children's television worldwide by deepening understanding and promoting communication among nations.

Shaw Rocket Prize
Created in 2005, the Shaw Rocket Prize winner receives a rocket shaped statuette and CA$50,000, and is awarded for the best independent Canadian children's television program. The prize is given annually by the Shaw Rocket Fund, who provide financial support to Canadian productions.

SHINE Awards
The SHINE (Sexual Health IN Entertainment) Awards, originally the Nancy Susan Reynolds Awards, are conducted by The Media Project. The awards honour accurate and honest portrayals of sexuality in programming.

Teen Choice Awards
The Teen Choice Awards are presented annually by the Fox Broadcasting Company and Global Television Network. The program honors the year's biggest achievements in music, movies, sports, and television, as voted by teenagers aged twelve to nineteen. Degrassi: The Next Generation has garnered two awards for Degrassi.

TCA Awards
The Television Critics Association (or TCA) is a group of approximately 200 United States and Canadian journalists and columnists who cover television programming. Since 1984 the organization has hosted the TCA Awards, honoring television excellence in 11 categories, which are presented every summer. Degrassi Junior High and Degrassi: The Next Generation have each won one award.

TV Guide Reader's Choice Award
In 1989, the stars of Degrassi Junior High were featured on the cover of TV Guide after winning a Reader's Choice Award.

U. S. International Film and Video Festival
The U. S. International Film and Video Festival grants Gold Camera, Silver Screen and Certificate of Creative Excellence awards. Winners are selected on the effectiveness of purpose and creativity not just numerical scoring. Therefore, the top award in a category is not necessarily a Gold Camera, but may be a Silver or Certificate winner. Conversely, more than one Gold, Silver or Certificate may be presented in a category. Degrassi has won one Silver Screen Award through Degrassi: The Next Generation in 2003.

Young Artist Awards
Beginning in 1979, the Young Artist Awards have been presented annually in Los Angeles by the Young Artist Foundation. They have given Degrassi seven awards and twenty-four more nominations.

Young Entertainer Awards
The Young Entertainer Awards were first presented in 2016.  The awards bring together young performers and their families to honor and celebrate their performance achievements in film, television, music, and stage in an awards show just for young entertainers.

Footnotes

References
 

Awards
Degrassi lists
Degrassi